The main article describes all European Soling Championships from one the first held in 1968 to the announced Championships in the near future. This article states the detailed results, where relevant the controversies, and the progression of the Championship during the series race by race of the European Soling Championships in the years 2005, 2006, 2007, 2008 and 2009. This is based on the major sources: World Sailing, the world governing body for the sport of sailing recognized by the IOC and the IPC, and the publications of the International Soling Association. Unfortunately not all crew names are documented in the major sources.

2005 Final results 

 2005 Progress

2006 Final results 

 2006 Progress

2007 Final results

Controversion
After the finish of the last race a protest was lodged by ITA 198 against SLO 1. An illegal helmsman swap was observed by ITA and the judges. The protest should have been handled by the International Jury. However, one of the overseas members of the jury needed to catch a plane so that the jury did not comply with the rules for an international jury. The decision was that SLO 1 was disqualified and GER 304 became European championship. SLO 1 made an appeal and since there was no International Jury the appeal was handled by a Norwegian appeal committee. That committee ruled different than the original verdict and SLO1 was reinstated. The final result is found below:

 2007 Progress

2008 Final results 

 2008 Progress

2009 Final results 

 2009 Progress

Further results
For further results see:
 Soling European Championship results (1968–1979)
 Soling European Championship results (1980–1984)
 Soling European Championship results (1985–1989)
 Soling European Championship results (1990–1994)
 Soling European Championship results (1995–1999)
 Soling European Championship results (2000–2004)
 Soling European Championship results (2005–2009)
 Soling European Championship results (2010–2014)
 Soling European Championship results (2015–2019)
 Soling European Championship results (2020–2024)

References

Soling European Championships